The 2019 New Hampshire Wildcats football team represented the University of New Hampshire as a member of the Colonial Athletic Association (CAA) in the 2019 NCAA Division I FCS football season. They were led by interim head coach Ricky Santos, due to longtime head coach Sean McDonnell taking a leave of absence for medical reasons. The team played their home games at Wildcat Stadium. The Wildcats finished the season 6–5 overalla nd 5–3 in CAA play to tie for third place.

Previous season

The Wildcats finished the 2018 season 4–7, 3–5 in CAA play to finish in ninth place.

Preseason

CAA poll
In the CAA preseason poll released on July 23, 2019, the Wildcats were predicted to finish in seventh place.

Preseason All–CAA team
The Wildcats had one player selected to the preseason all-CAA team.

Defense

Pop Lacey – S

Schedule

Game summaries

at Holy Cross

at FIU

Rhode Island

Duquesne

Elon

at Stony Brook

at Delaware

Villanova

at James Madison

at Albany

Maine

Ranking movements

References

New Hampshire
New Hampshire Wildcats football seasons
New Hampshire Wildcats football